Artur Franciszek Oppman (August 14, 1867 – November 4, 1931) was a Polish poet of the Young Poland period, who wrote under the pen name "Or-Ot".

Biography
Oppman was born August 14, 1867, in Warsaw to a burgher family with German roots, which had arrived in Poland in 1708 from Thuringia. The family quickly became attached to Poland and cultivated Polish patriotism; Artur's grandfather took part in the Polish November Uprising and his father in the January Uprising.

Artur studied initially at a gymnasium in Warsaw, but due to severe Russification pressure (Warsaw at the time was part of the Russian partition of Poland) he moved to an alternate trade school. It was there that he began writing poetry. His peculiar pen-name materialized in the publication of his second poem, when an abbreviation of his name, "Ar-Op", was mistakenly rendered as "Or-Ot" by the type-setter. His first poems were published in magazines such as Kurier Warszawski, Wędrowiec and Kurier Codzienny, which sought to promote new talent. Between 1883 and 1885 he also published in Tygodnik Ilustrowany, Kłosy and Świt.

Between 1890 and 1892 he studied philology at the Jagiellonian University, in Kraków. He was particularly interested in the literature and the Polish language of the sixteenth century. In 1892 he married Władysława Trynkiewicz and suspended his studies, returning to Warsaw. He frequented the city's Old Town, and studied the borough's people, lifestyle, customs and local legends. On the basis of these experiences in 1893 he published a collection of poems Ze Starego Miasta ("From the Old Town"), and in 1894 a related volume Pieśni ("Songs").

In 1920 he enlisted in the army of the newly reconstituted Republic of Poland, as a private in the infantry. He was made the editor of the army's magazine, Żołnierz Polski ("Soldier of  Poland").

Works
His poems which celebrated the charms of Warsaw's old towns were especially popular. His poems were also published in several other magazines, and between 1901 and 1905 he became the editor of Wędrowiec. Oppman established extensive contacts in Warsaw's literary world, and often met with Bolesław Prus, Stefan Żeromski, Felicjan Faleński, Władysław Reymont, Kazimierz Przerwa-Tetmajer, Bolesław Leśmian, Antoni Lange, Wojciech Kossak, Jan Lechoń and others.

Oppman also wrote numerous works for children, and edited calendars, almanacs and poetry compilations.

References

External links
 
 

1867 births
1931 deaths
19th-century Polish poets
Polish male poets